Brian Johnson (born 29 June 1939 or 29 June 1940) is a British designer and director of film and television special effects.

Life and career
Born Brian Johncock, he changed his surname to Johnson during the 1960s. Joining the team of special effects artist Les Bowie, Johnson started his career behind the scenes for Bowie Films on productions such as On The Buses, and for Hammer Films.  He is known for his special effects work on TV series including Thunderbirds (1965–66) and films including Alien (1979), for which he received the 1980 Academy Award for Best Visual Effects (shared with H. R. Giger, Carlo Rambaldi, Dennis Ayling and Nick Allder). Previously, he had built miniature spacecraft models for Stanley Kubrick's 1968 film 2001: A Space Odyssey.

Johnson's work on Space: 1999 influenced the effects of the Star Wars films of the 1970s and 1980s. Impressed by his work, George Lucas visited Johnson during the production of the TV series to offer him the role of effects supervisor for the 1977 film. Having already been commissioned for the second series of Space: 1999, Johnson was unable to accept at the time. He worked on the sequel, The Empire Strikes Back (1980), whose special effects were recognised in the form of a 1981 Special Achievement Academy Award (which Johnson shared with Richard Edlund, Dennis Muren and Bruce Nicholson).

Awards
Johnson has won Academy Awards for both Alien (1979) and The Empire Strikes Back (1980). He was further nominated for an Academy Award for his work on Dragonslayer (1981). In addition, Johnson is the recipient of a Saturn Award for The Empire Strikes Back and a BAFTA Award for James Cameron's  Aliens.

Filmography

Special effects

 Quatermass 2 (1957) (special effects assistant, uncredited)
 The Kiss of the Vampire (1963) (special effects assistant, uncredited)
 Thunderbirds (TV series) (1965–66) (special effects director)
 2001: A Space Odyssey (1968) (special effects assistant, uncredited)
 Moon Zero Two (1969) (special effects assistant, uncredited)
 Taste the Blood of Dracula (1970) (special effects) (as Brian Johncock)
 When Dinosaurs Ruled the Earth (1970) (special effects) (as Brian Johncock)
 A Clockwork Orange (1971) (special effects assistant, uncredited)
 Space: 1999 (TV series) (special effects—24 episodes, 1975–76; special effects director—24 episodes, 1976–78; special effects designer—18 episodes, 1976–78; special effect designer—6 episodes, 1976)
 The Day After Tomorrow (TV pilot, 1975) (special effects designer)
 The Medusa Touch (1978) (special effects supervisor)
 Revenge of the Pink Panther (1978) (special effects)
 Alien (1979) (special effects supervisor)
 The Empire Strikes Back (1980) (special effects supervisor)
 Dragonslayer (1981) (supervisor of special mechanical effects)
 The Pirates of Penzance (1983) (special effects supervisor)
 The NeverEnding Story (1984) (director of special effects)
 Spies Like Us (1985) (special effects supervisor)
 Aliens (1986) (special effects)
 Slipstream (1989) (special effects)
 Dragonheart (1996) (micro-light coordinator)
 Space Truckers (1996) (special effects supervisor)
 Dream Street (1999) (director)

Director
 Scragg 'n' Bones (2006)

References

External links

1939 births
Best Visual Effects Academy Award winners
Best Visual Effects BAFTA Award winners
British film directors
Living people
People from Surrey
Miniature model-makers
Special Achievement Academy Award winners